Novelas TV is an African thematic television channel dedicated to telenovelas broadcasts since 24 March 2015 through Les Bouquets Canal+. It has been available in the Metropolitan France area since 26 September 2017.

Programming
Corazón valiente
Cuando seas mía
El Cuerpo del Deseo
En otra piel
Gavilanes
La casa de al lado
La Chacala
La Madrastra
La Patrona
Los miserables
Marimar
Paloma
Rubí
Santa Diabla 
Şeref Meselesi
Teresa
Terra Nostra 
Tierra de reyes
Un camino hacia el destino
Una Maid en Manhattan
Vino el amor
Yo no creo en los hombres
"Fatmagùl"

Distribution
Novelas TV is available on channel 23 within the Les Bouquets Canal+ which is distributed in more than 30 Central African and West African countries. Overseas people can watch the channel at La Réunion and in the Caribbeans on channel number 29.

References

External links
 

Television stations in France
French-language television stations
Television channels and stations established in 2015
2015 establishments in France
Mass media in Paris
Canal+